The 2001–02 season, covering the period from 22 September 2001 to 17 May 2002,  was Al-Talaba Sport Club's 27th consecutive season in the Iraqi Elite League, top-flight of Iraqi football. Having finished in 4th place in the previous season, Al-Talaba competed in the Iraqi Elite League, the Iraq FA Cup and the Iraqi Elite Cup.

Throughout their league season, Al-Talaba were consistent in their results having won 29 matches, drawn four and lost five from the total 38 matches and scored 89 goals. It was Al-Talaba's fifth league shield after a consecutive eight years since their last league title in 1992–93. In the Iraq FA Cup, Al-Talaba reached the final after defeating the four teams that they faced to come up against Al-Shorta in the final where they won 1–0 after Qusay Hashim's 85th-minute goal, achieving their first double. In their third competition of the season, the 2001–02 Iraqi Elite Cup which was played in February 2002, Al-Talaba reached the final for the fourth time in their history where they lost to Al-Shorta with Mahir Habib's single goal in the 112nd minute of extra time. They ended their season achieving two titles and as the runners-up of the other one. They were also awarded the Baghdad Day Cup title for their 2–1 league win over Al-Zawra'a which was played on Baghdad Day (14 November).

Players

Squad information

Players In

Competitions

Overall record

Iraqi Elite League

Group stage

Results by round

Matches

Source: Rec.Sport.Soccer Statistics Foundation

Iraq FA Cup

Round 1

Round 2

Quarterfinal

Semifinal

Final

Source: Rec.Sport.Soccer Statistics Foundation and Kooora Forums

Iraqi Elite Cup

Group stage

Matches

Semifinal

Final

Source: Rec.Sport.Soccer Statistics Foundation

References

Sport in Baghdad
Al Talaba seasons
Al-Talaba SC
Al Talaba